Twakka Tukka Returns is a Nepali sitcom which airs in Kantipur Television Network every Friday. This sitcom features Dinesh D C as a host he tells what is going to happen next on the show.

The program is based on the original comedy series Twakka Tukka popular in 1990s aired by the Nepal Television.

Cast 
 Dinesh D.C. as host
 Mahadev Tripathi as Premcharo and Jadugar
 Sivashankhar Rijal as Jogindar
 Surendra KC as Mulako Sag
 Gopal Dhakal as Chhande and Mr Funny
 Sushila Niraula as Bimli
Prem Pandey
 Ashim Suresh
 Janak Khadka
 Giri Raj
 Yesoda Giri
 Binod Pariyar

References 

Nepalese television series
Kantipur Television series
Nepalese television sitcoms
Television shows set in Nepal
2010s Nepalese television series